Sabce is a town in the Sabce Department of Bam Province in northern-central Burkina Faso. It is the capital of the Sabce Department and has a population of 2702.

References

External links
Satellite map at Maplandia.com

Populated places in the Centre-Nord Region
Bam Province